Mother Teresa or Mother Teresa of Calcutta usually refer to Anjezë Gonxhe Bojaxhiu (1910–97), an Albanian-born Catholic missionary nun and saint.

Mother Teresa may also refer to:
 Mother Teresa Ball (1794–1861) foundress of the Irish Branch of the Institute of the Blessed Virgin Mary
 Mother Teresa Lalor (1769–1846) Irish-born American Catholic nun

Mother Teresa of Calcutta may also refer to:
 Mother Teresa of Calcutta (film) 2003 documentary film

See also
 Commemorations of Mother Teresa, lists things named after Mother Teresa of Calcutta
 List of saints named Teresa